The Ultimate Collection, aka Gold and, later, Icon 2, is a retrospective 2-disc set of Barry White's career that was released in 2000. In 2008, it was substantially re-released as part of Universal Music's Gold series with the addition of the song "Baby, We Better Try To Get It Together" and the removal of the song "Love Makin' Music".

Track listing

Disc 1
 "I'm Gonna Love You Just a Little More Baby" (4:10)
 "I've Got So Much to Give" (5:15)
 "Never, Never Gonna Give You Up" (4:01)
 "Honey, Please, Can't Ya See" (3:15)
 "Can't Get Enough of Your Love, Babe" (3:48)
 "Baby Blues" - Love Unlimited Orchestra (5:36)	
 "You're the First, the Last, My Everything" (4:33)
 "What Am I Gonna Do with You" (3:40)
 "I'll Do for You Anything You Want Me To" (4:08)
 "Let the Music Play" (4:15)
 "You See the Trouble with Me" (3:22)
 "My Sweet Summer Suite" - Love Unlimited Orchestra (4:59)
 "Don't Make Me Wait Too Long" (4:42)
 "I'm Qualified to Satisfy You" (3:05)
 "Midnight and You" - Love Unlimited Orchestra (5:10)

Disc 2
 "Loves Theme" - Love Unlimited Orchestra (4:07)
 "It's Ecstasy When You Lay Down Next to Me" (3:24)
 "Oh, What a Night for Dancing" (3:56)
 "Playing Your Game, Baby" (3:38)
 "Your Sweetness is My Weakness" (4:41)
 "Just the Way You Are" (4:10)
 "Love Serenade, Pts. 1 & 2" (7:48)	
 "Satin Soul" - Love Unlimited Orchestra (4:15)	
 "It Ain't Love Babe (Until You Give It)" (4:19)	
 "Love Makin' Music" (4:57)	
 "Sho' You Right" (3:57)
 "Put Me in Your Mix" (4:42)
 "Practice What You Preach" (3:55)	
 "Come On" (3:48)	
 "Staying Power" (3:59)

Charts

Weekly charts

Year-end charts

Certifications

References

2000 compilation albums
Barry White albums
UTV Records compilation albums
Hip-O Records compilation albums